Synanthedon polaris is a moth of the family Sesiidae. It is found in the Alps of Switzerland and Italy and in Fennoscandia and northern Russia.

The wingspan is 22–26 mm.

The larvae feed on Salix lapponum, Salix lanata and Salix hastata.

References

Moths described in 1877
Sesiidae
Moths of Europe